Mexico competed at the 2011 World Aquatics Championships in Shanghai, China between July 16 and 31, 2011.

Medalists

Diving

Mexico has qualified 13 athletes in diving.

Men

Women

Open water swimming

Men

Women

Mixed

Swimming

Mexico qualified 9 swimmers.

Men

Women

Synchronised swimming

Mexico has qualified 10 athletes in synchronised swimming.

Women

Reserve
Karla Arreola
Valeria Montano

References

Nations at the 2011 World Aquatics Championships
Aqu
Mexico at the World Aquatics Championships